Kania is a surname of several possible origins. It is Polish-language surname literally meaning a small bird of prey of the family Accipitridae. It is also an Indian surname. Notable people with this surname include:

 Andrew Kania (born 1967), Canadian Member of Parliament
 Jakub Kania (1872–1957), Polish poet, folk writer and national activist
 Jakub Kania (ice hockey) (born 1990), Czech ice hockey defenceman
 H. J. Kania (1890–1951), first Chief Justice of India
 Madhukar Hiralal Kania (1927–2016), 23rd Chief Justice of India
 Paula Kania (born 1992), Polish tennis player
 Stanisław Kania (1927–2020), Polish politician 
 Wojciech Kania (1912–1991), Polish military officer
 Zbigniew Kania, Polish sport sailor

See also 
 

Surnames of Hindustani origin
Surnames from nicknames
Polish-language surnames